Kryan or Cryan may refer to:

 Kryan Johnson (born 1994), rugby league player
 St. Kryan's, Newfoundland and Labrador, a settlement in Canada
 Cryan, a surname

See also
 The Cryan' Shames, an American band
 Cryon, New South Wales, a parish and hamlet in Australia
 Crion, a commune in France